Amos is an unincorporated community in northwest Vernon County, in the U.S. state of Missouri.

The community is approximately 1.5 miles east of the Missouri-Kansas border, approximately three miles north-northwest of Stotesbury, and about 16 miles northwest of Nevada. It is on the banks of Duncan Creek one mile north of that stream's confluence with the Little Osage River.

History
Amos was platted in 1894 when the railroad was extended to that point. The community has the name of Amos Nickerson, a local merchant. A post office called Amos was established in 1893, and remained in operation until 1931.

In 1925, Amos had 31 inhabitants.

References

Unincorporated communities in Vernon County, Missouri
Unincorporated communities in Missouri